Darling Parade is an American Alternative Rock band from Nashville, formed in early 2007. The band consists of Kristin Kearns (vocals/guitar), Nate McCoy (guitar/vocals), Dustin McCoy (bass/vocals), and Casey Conrad (drums). By December 5, 2011, the band were ranked at No. 8 on the Billboard Next Big Sound Chart. On May 4, 2012, their music video for "Never Wrong" was voted to the No. 1 position on The Freshmen mtvU. Their debut full-length studio album, Battle Scars & Broken Hearts was released on April 2, 2013, by Page 2 Music.

In June 2013, Darling Parade was declared the winner of the "Let's make a band famous" category at MTV & VH1's O Music Awards. The band performed live at MTV's VMA Week, and was named MTV's Artist to Watch.

Tours
 Supporting act in January and February 2012 on national tour with Cassadee Pope, Stephen Jerzak, and Justin Young
 Performance at Summerfest 2012 opening for Cherri Bomb & Chevelle.
 Performed multiple shows at Shout Fest 2010 where they opened for Switchfoot, Plumb, and Sixpence None The Richer.
 Supporting act on national tour with Trapt in 2014

Use in Film & TV
Promotional Trailer for Stargate Universe on SyFy Channel (2009)
The Lying Game - ABC Family
Fly Girls - The CW
Featured in SuperCuts "Rock the Cut" Ad (2013)

Band members
Current
Kristin Kearns – Lead Vocals, Rhythm Guitar
Nate McCoy – Lead Guitar, Backing Vocals
Dustin McCoy – Bass, Backing Vocals
Casey Conrad – Drums

Past
Adam Gooch
Jonathan Davis
Scotty Adams
Robert Fairless
Nathan Thurston

Discography

Studio albums

EPs
 Darling Parade (self-titled) (2009)
 What You Want (2010)
 Until We Say It's Over (2011)

Singles
"Ghost"
"Never Wrong"
"Crash And Burn"
"Run Away"

Collaborations
Stephen Christian of Anberlin co-wrote and provided guest vocals on "Remember" for the band's 3rd EP, Until We Say It's Over.

References

External links
 

American pop rock music groups
Musical groups from Nashville, Tennessee
Musical groups established in 2007